Jon Landry may refer to:

Jon Landry, Canadian ice hockey player 
Jon Landry, lead vocalist of the Canadian band The Stanfields
Jonathan Landry, drummer of the Canadian band Story Untold

See also
John Landry, Canadian country musician
John Landry (actor), British actor